A list of Ukrainian language encyclopedias:

 History of Cities and Villages in Ukrainian SSR (Istoriya mist i sil Ukrayinskoyi RSR)
 Encyclopedic Dictionary of Astronomy (Astronomichnyi entsyclopedychnyi slovnyk)
 Geographical Encyclopedia of Ukraine (Heohrafichna entsyklopediya Ukrayiny)
 Mining Encyclopedia (Hirnycha entsyklopediya)
 Mining encyclopedic dictionary (Hirnychyi entsyklopedychnyi slovnyk)
 Economic encyclopedia (Ekonomichna entsyklopediya)
 Encyclopedia of the Kolomyia region (Entsyklopediya Kolomyshchyny)
 Encyclopedia of Cybernetics (Entsyklopediya kibernetyky)
 Encyclopedia of Education (Entsyklopediya osvity)
 Encyclopaedia of Modern Ukraine (Entsyklopediya suchasnoyi Ukrainy)
 Encyclopedia of Ukraine (in English)
 Encyclopedia of Ukrainian Studies (Entsyklopediya ukrayinoznavstva)
 Encyclopedia of History of Ukraine (Entsyklopediya istoriyi Ukrayiny)
 Kiev (Encyclopedic handbook) (Kyiv (entsyklopedychnyi dovidnyk))
 Encyclopedia of Literature Studies (Entsyklopediya literaturoznavstva)
 Small Mining Encyclopedia (Mala hirnycha entsyklopediya)
 Artists of Ukraine: Encyclopedic handbook (Mytsi Ukrayiny:Entsyklopedychnyi dovidnyk)
 City and people. Yelizavetgrad - Kirovohrad, 1754-2004 (Misto i lyudy. Yelyzavethrad - Kirovohrad, 1754-2004)
 Poltava region: Encyclopedic handbook (Poltavshchyna:Entsyklopedychnyi dovidnyk)
 Middle Age Castles of Europe (Serednyovichni zamky Yevropy)
 Ternopil Encyclopedic Dictionary (Ternopil's'kyi entsyklopedychnyi slovnyk)
 Ukrainian people in its past and today (Ukrainskiy narod v ego proshlom i nastoyashchem)
 Ukrainian Wikipedia (Ukrayins'ka wikipediya)
  (Ukrayins'ka mala entsyklopediya)
 Ukrainian General Encyclopedia (Ukrayins'ka zahalna entsyklopediya)
 Ukrainian literary encyclopedia (Ukrayins'ka literaturna entsyklopediya)
 Ukrainian Soviet Encyclopedia (Ukrayins'ka radyans'ka entsyklopediya)
 Ukrainian Soviet Encyclopedic Dictionary (Ukrayinskyi radyanskyi entsyklopedychnyi slovnyk)
 Universal dictionary-encyclopedia (Universal'na slovnyk-entsyklopediya)
 Chernihiv region: Encyclopedic handbook (Chernihivshchyna:entsyklopedychnyi dovidnyk)
 Shevchenko encyclopedia (Shevchenkivs'ka entsyklopediya)
 Shevchenko dictionary (Shevchenkivs'kyi slovnyk)
 Legal encyclopedia (Yurydychna entsyklopediya)

 
Lists of encyclopedias